Austroaeschna hardyi is a species of large dragonfly in the family Telephlebiidae, known as the lesser Tasmanian darner. It inhabits streams and rivers in Western Tasmania, Australia.

Austroaeschna hardyi is a dark dragonfly with dull markings. It appears similar to the Tasmanian darner, Austroaeschna tasmanica.

Gallery

See also
 List of dragonflies of Australia

References

Telephlebiidae
Odonata of Australia
Endemic fauna of Australia
Taxa named by Robert John Tillyard
Insects described in 1917